Gregory P. McGuckin (born July 2, 1961) is an American Republican Party politician who has served in the New Jersey General Assembly, representing the 10th Legislative District since January 10, 2012.

Early life 
McGuckin was born in East Orange, New Jersey and raised in Brick Township, where his father John McGuckin was the town's first directly elected mayor. He earned a B.A. degree from Providence College in 1983 and a J.D. degree from Seton Hall University School of Law in 1987 (New Jersey Governor Chris Christie graduated the same year). He interned for U.S. District Court judge John W. Bissell in 1986 and clerked for Judges of the New Jersey Superior Court in Ocean County in 1987–1988. He became an associate with the Forked River law firm of Dasti, Murphy & Wellerson, and was named a partner in the firm, now known as Dasti, Murphy, McGuckin, Ulaky, Cherkos & Connors. McGuckin was elected to the Toms River Township Council in 2003 and was re-elected in 2005 and 2009. He was selected as Council President, serving from 2004 to 2011.

In 2008, Mcguckin launched a bid to run for Toms River Township council. He suspended his political campaign after it was reported that he had more than $120,000 in federal leins placed against him by the IRS for failure to pay taxes.

New Jersey Assembly 
In 2011, incumbent Assemblyman James W. Holzapfel ran for the New Jersey Senate seat of the retiring Andrew R. Ciesla, and McGuckin ran for the open Assembly seat. He and his running mate David W. Wolfe defeated the Democratic candidates Bette Wary and Eli Eytan, and he was sworn in on January 10, 2012.

Committees 
Homeland Security and State Preparedness
Transportation and Independent Authorities

Government Legal Work 
In 2020, McGuckin was appointed the Director of Public Law for the Township of Toms River. Toms River Councilman Daniel Rodrick filed a lawsuit against McGuckin claiming he was illegally hired for the job.  The lawsuit was dismissed by the Assignment Judge of the New Jersey Superior Court, Ocean County, with prejudice due to Rodrick's complaint having no merit.  Rodrick cost that taxpayers of Toms River Township thousands of dollars in legal fees to defend the frivolous lawsuit.

Electoral history

Assembly

References

External links
Assemblyman Gregory P. McGuckin's legislative web page, New Jersey Legislature
 Asbury Park Press - Councilman files lawsuit against McGuckin
New Jersey Legislature financial disclosure forms
2012 **&**
2011

1961 births
Living people
New Jersey city council members
New Jersey lawyers
Republican Party members of the New Jersey General Assembly
People from Brick Township, New Jersey
Politicians from East Orange, New Jersey
Politicians from Ocean County, New Jersey
People from Toms River, New Jersey
Providence College alumni
Seton Hall University School of Law alumni
21st-century American politicians